is a Japanese manga series written and illustrated by Shinobu Ohtaka. It was serialized in Square Enix's seinen manga magazine Young Gangan (first named Gangan YG) from January 2004 to February 2009, with its chapters collected in twelve tankōbon volumes. The story centers on a young girl, a strong martial artist, who wants to marry and bear a child with a boy that she believes to be a strong fighter. A twenty-two episode anime television series adaptation by Studio Hibari was broadcast on TV Asahi from October 2006 to March 2007, with two additional original video animation (OVA) episodes released in August 2007. The manga was licensed for English release in North America by Yen Press.

Plot
Kōshi Inuzuka is a normal high school student aspiring to become a prosecutor after graduating. One day, a strange girl named Momoko Kuzuryū approaches him, revealing that they are betrothed and expected to produce a strong child together, although Kōshi does not accept this odd notion. Apparently the betrothal resulted from Kōshi's and Momoko's fathers having arranged the marriage. After Kōshi and Momoko's initial meeting, Kōshi realizes that Momoko is not just a normal — albeit strange — girl, as she has been trained by her father in a special form of martial arts known only to twelve families in all of Japan. Each of these twelve families correlates with one of the twelve animals of the Chinese zodiac. Momoko's family is associated with the Dragon, while Kōshi's family is associated with the Dog. The Dragon family is the head of the six families of the west, whereas the Dog family is the head of the six families of the east.

Before long, it is revealed to Kōshi and Momoko that five of the six western families are out on a plot to assassinate Kōshi to prevent him from marrying Momoko, which would cement the twelve families together by bonds of blood. This assassination would be the start of a martial artist war, which would be the seventh such war of the twelve zodiac Masters of Japan. Kōshi must now fight for his life as Momoko protects him, hoping he will return her affection.

Characters

Kōshi is an intelligent, yet physically weak seventeen-year-old high school student who is the son of Unken Inuzuka, a martial arts master and member of one of the twelve zodiac Master families of Japan. His family is associated with the Dog of the Chinese zodiac. However, against his father's wishes, he wants nothing to do with martial arts. He has avoided training ever since being terrorized by bullies at a young age, which initially caused him to freeze every time that he sees violence. Due to this, he wants to someday become a prosecutor so that he will be able to punish crimes effectively. As such, he is constantly seen reading books on laws and codes that govern Japan. Whenever he finds himself about to get into a fight, he recites several laws that his attacker is about to break as well as the consequences, in an attempt to dissuade the attacker, which is not always effective. He seems to believe that martial arts do not have any realistically applicable power and the rule of law can be used as a weapon against enemies.
Kōshi initially wants nothing to do with Momoko, or the martial arts war that he has been thrown right in the middle of. He instead focuses even more on his studies so as to keep his mind off of being targeted for assassination. Gradually, he seems to develop a greater appreciation and caring for Momoko and manages to overcome his tendency to freeze up in the face of violence.

Momoko is a strange and[hyperactive, barefoot young girl who is also a martial artist in a special form of martial arts that only members of the twelve zodiac Masters of Japan can learn. She is associated with the Dragon of the Chinese zodiac. She wants to become Kōshi's bride in order to produce a strong son with him, as her father told her that since she is a female, she is currently unable to master her family's martial arts techniques effectively. Momoko shares a strange relationship with Kōshi—its early stages have been compared to that of a dog and its master in the series itself. Momoko is very adamant about marrying Kōshi, and often tries to do the best she can to please him in any way. Her martial arts skill is very incredible for a girl at her age which is very useful to protect Kōshi from the assassins. Despite the fact that Momoko is always barefoot, she does start to wear shoes to school after Kōshi buys her a pair which she only wears when she is not fighting. She has a very strong heart and sense of determination. For Kōshi's sake, Momoko will do anything even sacrifice herself for him because she loves him too much and always believes in Kōshi.

Iroha is a young girl of fifteen and a member of the family of zodiac Masters associated with the Snake. The Miyamoto group was once a feared yakuza gang, but its power, repute and membership dwindled under Iroha's father; his kind nature did not inspire hardened criminals to remain loyal. Iroha, along with her subordinate Hanzō with whom she travels, are the first to attempt the assassination of Kōshi. Iroha wants to restore the reputation her family used to have as the most fearful of the twelve zodiac Masters by killing Kōshi, but is hindered by Momoko. Eventually, Iroha develops a crush on Kōshi and resolves to find a new path for the Miyamoto family, after Momoko praises her for her fortitude in battle and laments that Iroha should follow the path of an assassin. Iroha eventually develops a close friendship with Momoko and supports her to get closer to Kōshi.

Sanae is a female high school student who is also one of Kōshi's friends. She is also his class' representative. Unknown to everyone, however, she changes into a heroine known as Tenchū Senshi Uma Kamen, literally meaning "Divine Punishment Warrior Horse Mask", the identity she uses to fight as a superhero. She is apparently also the granddaughter of Iroha's and Hanzō's landlady. Both she and her grandmother are masters associated with the Horse of the zodiac. As the chosen protector of the Inuzuka heir, Sanae has been given her tribe's special outfit to wear, which increases its wearer's power. Alas, the outfit closely resembles a bondage costume and is most effective when less of it is worn; when the wearer only has certain pieces of the costume equipped, their power is highly focused in the parts covered. In the Nakajima family, kicks are the central part of their combat style, so the costume is most effective for Sanae when she wears nothing but the boots. Sanae harbors 
Sanae harbors a tragic love for Kōshi, since he considers her his very best friend and she is supposed to be guarding him from the shadows, not pursuing a relationship with him. Kōshi's marriage with Momoko is also something she is meant to support. However, due to her kind and caring personality she cares for Momoko when she is hurt. Just like Iroha, Sanae supports Momoko and Kōshi, because she thinks Momoko is more suitable for Kōshi; as she said herself, "For me being a flower in the shadow is suitable enough."

Hanzō is seventeen and Iroha's subordinate in the plot to kill Kōshi. Since Iroha saved his life one day, he has followed her orders closely. The two of them share a relationship like Kōshi and Momoko in that it could be likened to a Dog and its master, although Iroha appreciates Hanzō from the start; he is the only member of her family's once feared yakuza legion that has remained at her side. This is because he admires her greatly and considers her example an inspiration to improve himself. It is also quite likely that he has become romantically infatuated with Iroha. Unfortunately for him, Iroha states publicly that she considers him to be like a brother to her and considers the idea of a romantic relationship between them impossible.

Tenka is from the Tiger family of the twelve zodiac Masters and initially comes to assassinate Kōshi. As he is from the Tiger family, he carries a lot of traits with his personality that are akin to that of a feline such as being aquaphobic, and liking to play with round objects. He always carries around with him a soccer ball which he nicknamed  which seems to talk to him. (Although bystanders have commented that he is using ventriloquism.) Bekki has spoken to Tenka since early childhood, 'her' voice maturing just as he matured. Tenka has a crush on Momoko based on a time when they met as children, when he defeated her during a training match and they agreed to meet again. Unfortunately for Tenka, while he assumed they would meet and marry once Momoko had grown stronger, she intended to meet and have a death match. Tenka later returns to warn Momoko of the fact that his relatives are coming to attack her and Kōshi and takes their side during the battle. At the end of the anime, relations between Tenka and the main cast are much more friendly than initially.

Unken is a martial arts master and the father of Kōshi. He wants his son to follow in his footsteps, but is unable to persuade him to train in the martial arts. He heads the Dog family of the zodiac Masters of Japan. He and Sendayū are both friends and rivals. An old school photo shows that, although he now has a rather odd face, he was once the spitting image of his son. This has caused Kōshi some concern for the future.

Sendayū is a martial arts master and the father of Momoko. He told Momoko to find the strongest warrior and marry him, eventually bearing the strongest child since Momoko cannot master her family's techniques as she is female.

Inaho is an anime-only character, a representative of the Kameda family, which once contested the Nakajima family for the right to be the protector of the Inuzuka family. The Kameda family is associated with turtles, which do not appear in the Chinese zodiac. In order to gain ascendancy over the twelve families, Inaho studies law and gains a teacher's license in a bid to get close to Kōshi as his school teacher and marry him—despite having a dislike for law and considering becoming a teacher a lot of hard work. Like Sanae, she has an alter ego named Kame Kamen (Turtle Mask), with an equally exposing outfit which features several large pieces of armor plating, like a turtle's shell. She goes so far as to try to drive off Momoko and kidnap Kōshi after drugging him because she could not seduce him, but in the end relinquishes her efforts in the face of Sanae's dedication. She admits to having developed genuine feelings for Kōshi. Unfortunately for her, he did not reciprocate, considering a relationship between a student and teacher to be unethical.

Alice is another anime-only character, and is a member of the Uzuki clan, which is associated with the Rabbit of the Chinese zodiac; she has a unique "rabbit ear" hairstyle when she dons her combat gear. While the Uzuki clan is heavily involved with assassinations and Alice is considered one of their best, she breaks away from her family and goes on the run, aspiring to becoming a successful musician. Eventually, Alice meets and befriends Saigō, leaving her open to blackmail from her own clan. She receives the order to either kill Kōshi or be responsible for Saigō's death. After nearly succeeding in the deed, Alice is stopped by Saigō, who tells her - through interpreter Momoko - that her hands were made to create music, not shed blood. Thanks to the other young martial artists' intervention, Alice finally manages to leave her clan behind and goes to France to study music.

Saigō is a large, muscular young man who attends the same school as Kōshi and the rest of the main cast. He has a very threatening demeanor, communicating mostly in grunts and gestures and continuously wears sunglasses. He is the admired leader of a trio of hoodlums from Kōshi's class and apparently frequently gets into fights. Appearances are deceiving, however; Saigō is quite fond of kittens, of which he has several, and apparently reads romantic stories for enjoyment. When he first meets Alice Uzuki, he defends her against a large group of assassins without any concern for his own safety. Later, he takes a hit from Alice's guitar string weapon to protect Kōshi from harm. He falls deeply in love with Alice and seeks help from Momoko and the other main cast to find a way to deepen their relationship.

Media

Manga
Written and illustrated by Shinobu Ohtaka, Sumomomo, Momomo started in the inaugural issue of Square Enix's seinen manga magazine  on January 30, 2004; the magazine was later rebranded as Young Gangan on December 3 of the same year. The series finished on February 6, 2009. Square Enix collected its chapters in twelve tankōbon volumes, released from May 5, 2005, to February 25, 2009.

The manga has been licensed by Yen Press for distribution in English in North America. The manga was initially serialized in Yen Press' Yen Plus anthology magazine, the first issue of which went on sale on July 29, 2008. The twelve collected volumes were released from May 12, 2009, to May 29, 2012.

Volume list

Anime
A twenty-two episode anime television series adaptation, animated by Studio Hibari and directed by Nobuaki Nakanishi, was broadcast on TV Asahi from October 6, 2006, to March 16, 2007. Two additional original video animation (OVA) episodes were released with the ninth DVD set of the series on August 24, 2007.

Episode list

References

External links
  
  
 

2004 manga
2006 anime television series debuts
2007 anime OVAs
Films with screenplays by Toshiki Inoue
Gangan Comics manga
Lantis (company)
Martial arts anime and manga
Romantic comedy anime and manga
Seinen manga
Square Enix franchises
Studio Hibari
Yen Press titles